Vivienne Jabri is a British  academic and writer. She is Professor of International Politics in the Department of War Studies, King's College London.

Affiliations
 Groundzero: Conflitti globali (editorial board member)
 ISA's International Political Sociology section, elected member of the executive committee
 British International Studies Association (ISA) Executive Committee
 Chair, ISA's International Political Sociology section.

Writings
Vivienne Jabri and Eleanor O'Gorman (eds.) Women Culture and International Relations (Lynne Rienner, 1999).
V. Jabri, Explorations of Difference in Normative International Relations, Chapter Three in V. Jabri and E. O'Gorman (eds.), Women, Culture, and International Relations (Lynne Rienner, 1999).
V. Jabri, Discourse Ethics, Democratic Practice, and the Possibility of Inter-Cultural Understanding, Chapter Three in H. Smith (ed.), Democracy and International Relations (Macmillan, London and New York, 2000).
V. Jabri, Reflections on the Study of International Relations, T.C. Salmon (ed.), Issues in International Relations (Routledge, 2000).
V. Jabri, Feminist Ethics and Hegemonic Global Politics, Alternatives, Vol. 29, No. 3 (June–July 2004), pp. 265–284.
V. Jabri, Critical Thought and Political Agency in Time of War, International Relations, Vol. 19, No. 1 (March 2005), pp. 70–79.
V. Jabri, War, the Politics of Security, and the Liberal State (Centre for European Policy Studies for the ELISE project, 2005).
V. Jabri, The Limits of Agency in Time of Emergency, J.P.A. Huysmans et al., The Politics of Protection (Routledge, 2005).
V. Jabri, Biopower and the Corporeality of Globalised Warfare, Michael Dillon and Andrew Neal (eds.), Foucault: Politics, Society, and War (Palgrave, 2008)
V. Jabri. The Postcolonial Subject: Claiming Politics/Governing Others in Late Modernity (Routledge, 2012).

References

External links
 King's College London website
 Vivienne Jabri's curriculum vitae (archived link). Challenge Liberty & Security.
 MacMillan Books, War and the Transformation of Global Politics

Living people
Place of birth missing (living people)
Year of birth missing (living people)
British political scientists
British non-fiction writers
Academics of King's College London
Women political scientists